Dysoptus pseudargus is a species of moth in the family Arrhenophanidae. It is known only from the lowland Amazonian Region of southern Peru.

The length of the forewings is 5-5.5 mm for males. Adults are on wing from September to November.

Etymology
The species' name is derived from the Greek words pseudos (lie) and argos (white). The naming comes from the physical similarities to Dysoptus argus.

External links
Family Arrhenophanidae

Dysoptus
Taxa named by Donald R. Davis (entomologist)
Moths described in 2003